The 1969 LFF Lyga was the 48th season of the LFF Lyga football competition in Lithuania.  It was contested by 17 teams, and Statybininkas Siauliai won the championship.

League standings

References
RSSSF

LFF Lyga seasons
1969 in Lithuania
LFF